Bintulu may refer to:
Bintulu
Bintulu District
Bintulu Division
Bintulu (federal constituency), represented in the Dewan Rakyat